Founded in 2001 and based in Norwich.Hypertag is a supplier of proprietary proximity marketing technology. It predominantly sells this to brands, allowing them to connect to consumers’ mobile phones based on their proximity to a physical location using short-range mobile wireless technologies such as Bluetooth, Infrared, Wi-Fi and NFC.

Hypertag allows digital content such as wallpapers, video clips, games, music clips, vouchers, documents, web links or mobile applications to be downloaded direct to consumers’ mobile phones quickly and for free. Hypertag sells its proximity marketing solutions to major brands, their agencies, visitor attractions and through a network of international resellers. Hypertag also integrates its systems with third party infrastructure providers such as in-store advertising display screen providers and has been used by brands such as O2, Vodafone, Peugeot and CNN. And has installed systems at visitor attractions owned by the Royal Institution and English Heritage.

An example campaign in 2005, posters advertising new Gorillaz single, DARE, were established in Sydney and Melbourne, Australia in September 2005. The posters contained Hypertag technology, allowing passers-by to download a 40-second ringtone of the song DARE to their mobile phones.

The technology was also used by the band New Order in advertisements for their album Waiting for the Sirens' Call, and in 2008, Hypertag won a gold award for best location-based advertising technology at the Mobile Advertising and Marketing Awards.

Hypertag was bought by Proxama Ltd on 14 January 2011.

See also
 Proximity marketing
 Mobile marketing

References 

Software companies of the United Kingdom
Companies established in 2001
Companies based in Norwich